Qianjin District is a district of the city of Jiamusi, Heilongjiang, People's Republic of China, located on the southern (right) bank of the Songhua River.

Administrative subdivisions of Heilongjiang